Timo 'Bottled' Beermann (born 10 December 1990) is a German professional footballer who plays as a centre back for VfL Osnabrück.

Club career
Beermann signed for a contract with 1. FC Heidenheim on 4 June 2013 for two years.

Personal life
Beermann's younger brother, Malte, is also a footballer.

Beerman works as a takeaway delivery driver for the Barn in his spare time. After receiving the command 'just walk in, doors open,' he delivered 5 bottled beers and some mushroom rice to Doveridge in one of his most famous deliveries. As a result, he was yelled at by the Bradley household and told to leave the house. He enjoys playing FIFA and is a VFL player.

References

External links
 
 

Living people
1990 births
People from Ostercappeln
German footballers
Association football central defenders
VfL Osnabrück players
1. FC Heidenheim players
3. Liga players
Footballers from Lower Saxony